State Highway 357 (SH 357) is a Texas state highway that runs along the southwestern end of Corpus Christi. The route was originally designated as FM 692 on June 4, 1946. On September 5, 1946, it was redesignated to SH 357.

Route description
SH 357 begins in southwestern Corpus Christi at FM 665 and heads towards the southeast along Saratoga Boulevard.  As it heads to the southeast, it passes under SH 286 (Crosstown Expressway) at a diamond interchange.  As it heads southeast from the interchange, the highway intersects FM 43 (Weber Road) and FM 2444 (Staples Street).  Saratoga Boulevard comes to an end at an intersection with Rodd Field Road.  SH 357 follows Rodd Field Road from this intersection to the northeast to its eastern terminus at SH 358 (South Padre Island Drive).

Junction list

References

357
Transportation in Corpus Christi, Texas
Transportation in Nueces County, Texas